Lee Kyung-hee (born 1969) is a South Korean female television screenwriter.

Lee Kyung-hee is also the name of:
Ko Eun-ah (actress, born 1946) (born Lee Kyung-hee), South Korean actress
Li Gyong-hui (born 1972), North Korean rhythmic gymnast
Ri Kyong-hui (born 1967), North Korean cross-country skier 
Lee Kyung-hee (footballer) (born 1978), South Korean female footballer
Grace Lee (born Lee Kyung-hee 1982), South Korean female television host